The KLW SE15B is a low-emissions diesel switcher locomotive built by Knoxville Locomotive Works. An unknown number SE15B locomotives is being produced for Chevron to be used in the refineries of Houston and Beaumont-Port Arthur, TX.

Original buyers

See also
 List of KLW locomotives
 List of GM-EMD locomotives

References

External links
  – Official KLW Website
  – Official Switcher Model Product Page

B-B locomotives
KLW locomotives
Railway locomotives introduced in 2015
Diesel-electric locomotives of the United States
EPA Tier 4-compliant locomotives of the United States
Rebuilt locomotives
Standard gauge locomotives of the United States